Cousins is a 2014 Indian Malayalam language romantic comedy film directed by Vysakh and scripted by Sethu. The film stars Kunchacko Boban, Indrajith Sukumaran, Suraj Venjaramoodu and Joju George in the title roles. Vedhika and Nisha Aggarwal play the female leads, while Pradeep Rawat, Kalabhavan Shajon, Kailash, Miya George, Shiju and Renji Panicker feature in supporting roles in the film. The story revolves around four cousins who undertake a journey with an intention, and followed by the issues they come across in between them. The film released on 19 December 2014.

Cousins is produced by Vysakh Rajan under the banner of Vyshakha Cinemas, Music is by M. Jayachandran for the lines of Murugan Kattakada and Rafeeq Ahamed. Bangalore, Pollachi and Kodaikanal are the main outside Kerala locations of this comedy movie.

Plot 
Sam is stuck somewhere in the past, courtesy a mishap that occurred six years back, that'd almost cost him his life. His psychiatrist suggests that he goes on a trip to Manipal where he was when the tragedy took place to try and recover his memories. Sam's fun loving cousins, Georgy, Pauly and Tony all join him on the fabulous road trip back to one of Sam's old, comforting places. Throughout the movie, the cousins meet Sam's girlfriend Aarathi (almost-wife)'s sister Mallika, and finds about their love story. Georgy already knows this and tells it to Pauly and Tony. He also tells them that when Sam and Aarathi tries to elope, her brother's men captured Sam but they didn't save Aarathi. Georgy comes to a conclusion that someone wants to kill Aarathi, so he decides to save her and makes her stay in their house. Georgy, Pauly and Tony decides to find the culprit who wants to kill Aarathi with Mallika's help.

Cast

 Kunchacko Boban as Sam, Arathi's love interest turned husband
 Indrajith Sukumaran as Georgy, Malli's love interest
 Suraj Venjaramoodu as Pauly
 Joju George as Tony
 Vedhika as Arathi, Sam's love interest turned wife
 Nisha Agarwal as Mallika/Malli, Georgy's love interest
 Pradeep Rawat as Nagarajan
 Kalabhavan Shajon as Veerappa Gounder
 Balachandran Chullikkadu as Varkey Master
 Kailash as Peter
 P. Balachandran as Guruji
 Shiju as Chandrarajan
 Santhosh as Devarajan
 Vijayakumar as Rajarajan
 Abu Salim as Itty, restaurant manager
 Sreedevi Unni as Arathi's and Mallika's grandmother
 Vinaya Prasad as Threasa, Sam and Georgy's mother 
 Sunil Sukhada as Pauly and Tony's father 
 Ponnamma Babu as Pauly And Tony's mother
 Kamalinee Mukherjee in a cameo appearance
 Miya as Ann (cameo)
 Ranji Panicker as Doctor (cameo)

Production
Vedhika was signed to portray Kunchacko Boban's love interest and Bhavana as Indrajith Sukumaran's love interest. But she was later replaced with Nisha Agarwal as the team felt that somebody who is not a complete Malayali would be apt for the role. Filming locations include Bangalore, Kochi, Pollachi, Kodaikanal and Athirapilly.

The filming started on 10 August 2014 at Bangalore Palace, where a majority of filming took place over the next weeks. Kamalini Mukherjee did an item number for the movie.

Soundtrack 
The film's soundtrack contains 5 songs, all composed by M. Jayachandran. Lyrics by Murukan Kattakkada, Rafeeq Ahamed.

Critical reception
The film received mixed reviews from critics and audience alike.
The good aspect of the movie would be the cinematography, which managed to visualise the movie in the best way possible. The art direction of the movie was commendable and added to the rich look of the movie. To conclude, "Cousins" passed to meet the expectations with excellent scripting and a highly predictable storyline.".<ref>{{cite news|title='Cousins' Movie Review:

References

External links
 

2014 films
Films scored by M. Jayachandran
Films shot in Bangalore
Films shot in Kodaikanal
Films shot in Kochi
Films shot in Pollachi
Films shot in Chalakudy
Films shot in Thrissur
Films directed by Vysakh
2010s Malayalam-language films